The 2021 470 World Championships were held from 5 to 13 March 2021 in Vilamoura, Portugal.

Medal summary

References

470 World Championships
470 World Championships
Sailing competitions in Portugal
2021 in Portuguese sport
470